Borut Ingolič (born 2 July 1939) is a Yugoslav middle-distance runner. He competed in the men's 800 metres at the 1960 Summer Olympics.

References

1939 births
Living people
Athletes (track and field) at the 1960 Summer Olympics
Yugoslav male middle-distance runners
Olympic athletes of Yugoslavia
Place of birth missing (living people)